The Armed Forces Medical College (AFMC) is a leading medical training institute in Pune, India, in the state of Maharashtra. The college is managed by the Indian Armed Forces.

Established in May 1948 as a post-graduate teaching institution after World War II on the recommendation of the BC Roy Committee, remnants of various Indian Army Medical Corps units were amalgamated to create the Armed Forces Medical Services. The AFMC undergraduate wing was established on 4 August 1962, which is also celebrated annually as AFMC Day by its alumni.

The institution primarily imparts training to medical undergraduates and postgraduates, dental postgraduates, nursing cadets and paramedical staff. Patient care forms an integral part of its training curriculum and the attached hospitals benefits from the expertise available at AFMC.  The institution is responsible for providing the entire pool of specialists and super specialists to the Armed Forces.  The college is also involved in conducting research in various medical subjects as well as those aspects which would affect the morale and performance of the Armed Forces both in war and peace.

History

The facility was originally Set up in 1944 by Lt. Colonel Darshan Singh Vohra to provide artificial limb, appliances and deliver rehabilitative care to the gallant soldiers of the Indian Army, who lost their limbs in combat. Post independence the AFMC was expanded further in 1948 in the immediate post-world war period.  On the recommendations of the BC Roy Committee, remnants of the Indian Army Medical Corps units were amalgamated into one unit to create the Armed Forces Medical College. Over the past 50 years, it has grown in its functions. The "Graduate Wing" of AFMC was established on 4 August 1962.  The aim of starting this wing was to increase the intake of medical graduates into the Armed Forces.  The graduate wing was affiliated to the University of Pune until 1999 but presently affiliated to the Maharashtra University of Health Sciences. The college is recognised by the Medical Council of India for conducting a five-year and six-month teaching programme leading to MBBS degree.  The first batch passed out in Oct 1966. It also conducts post graduate courses in many disciplines.

One of the first plastic surgery departments in India was established at the college in the early 1950s.

Admission 
A total of 150 students are admitted for undergraduate MBBS course, 115 boys and 30 girls and five foreign nationals. Admission is on the basis of the National Eligibility and Entrance Test (formerly through the AIPMT exam), followed by an interview and medical examination . Ten seats are reserved for ST/SC candidates. Students are not allowed to be married or to marry during the course, and are liable to serve in the medical services of the Armed Forces, on successful completion of MBBS, for seven years.

Residence halls
The college is fully residential with separate hostels for boys and girls.  Residence in the hostels is mandatory for all the cadets for the entire duration of the course.  The Boys Hostel is housed in a building which was built in 1965 and comprises 6 blocks of three floors each.  There are a total of 277 rooms of approximately  area (single-seaters) and 162 rooms of approximately  area (double seaters).  All the rooms are fully furnished.  The girls' hostel was constructed in 1984 and can accommodate 130 cadets in 70 single-seater and 30 double seater rooms.  The new Boys Hostel has four blocks with four floors each having 18 spacious rooms with balconies. The officers' floors for officers pursuing their post graduation courses have been incorporated into the boys hostel. Subsidised messing is provided to all medical cadets. The Central Cadets Mess was opened in 2009 for all cadets to dine together.

Infrastructure 

There are facilities for sports, including tennis, squash, basketball, and a swimming pool. Canteen facilities for defence personnel are also extended to the medical cadets. It has two auditoria named Dhanvantri and Bharadwaj where high-profile medical conferences are held. AFMC also works as a hospital for civilians and is collaborated with the command hospital (SC).

Rankings

AFMC was ranked 11 among government medical colleges in India in 2022 by Outlook India and third among medical colleges in India in 2022 by India Today. and

Non-academics 
AFMC provides broad-based non-academic exposure too.  Students are encouraged to participate in sports and many have excelled in this arena.  There are a large number of societies and clubs like the Student Scientific Society, Computer Club, Hobbies Club, Debating Club, Adventure Club, Dance Club and Musimatics. where students can pursue extra-curricular interests.  They are encouraged to participate in competitions and conferences all over the country for development of all round personality and officer like qualities.  They have also won many laurels in debates, quiz contests and youth festivals in Pune and outside.  Over 6000 doctors have graduated from AFMC until now. Recently the entire hostel has been given WiFi connectivity.

Research 

Various departments take up research projects either under departmental sponsorship or under the auspices of Armed Forces Medical Research Committee (AFMRC).  Apart from service-oriented projects, research in clinical and laboratory subjects is also carried out.  AFMC  has the facility for animal house, hatcheries for disease producing insects, and a virology and bacteriology bank for these purposes.  AFMC is a research and referral centre for confirmation of disease, identification of pathogens (viral and bacterial) and   classification of  blood disorders.  AFMC acts as a referral centre, designated by WHO for certain diseases i.e. HIV-regional laboratory and centre for rickettsial diseases.

Affiliations 
Affiliated hospitals include Command Hospital (Southern Command), Military Hospital (Cardio Thoracic Centre), Artificial Limb Centre and Military Hospital (Khadki). The college is affiliated to Maharashtra University of Health Sciences.

Notable alumni
 Punita Arora, first woman to reach the rank of Lieutenant General in the Indian Army
 Kamala Balakrishnan, immunologist, expert on histocompatibility and transplantation
 Padmavathy Bandopadhyay, first woman Air Marshal of the Indian Air Force.
 Madhuri Kanitkar, third woman to be promoted to Three-star rank.
 Surendra Poonia, medal-winner in four consecutive world championships in power-lifting
 Soumya Swaminathan, paediatrician, Chief Scientist, World Health Organisation (WHO), Deputy Director General of Programmes (DDP) of World Health Organization
 Akhilesh Pandey, notable  proteomicist.

See also
 Indian National Defence University
 Military Academies in India
 Sainik school

References

External links

https://www.afmc.nic.in/Departments/Hospitals/alc.html
College dramatics' YouTube channel

Military academies of India
Military education and training in India
Medical colleges in Maharashtra
Universities and colleges in Pune
Affiliates of Maharashtra University of Health Sciences
Educational institutions established in 1948
1948 establishments in India